Gertrude Blanch (2 February 1897, in Kolno, Russian Empire (now Poland) – 1 January 1996) was an American mathematician who did pioneering work in numerical analysis and computation. She was a leader of the Mathematical Tables Project in New York from its beginning. She worked later as the assistant director and leader of the Numerical Analysis at UCLA computing division and was head of mathematical research for the Aerospace Research Laboratory at Wright-Patterson Air Force Base in Dayton, Ohio.

Early years and education
Blanch was born on 2 February 1897 as Gittel Kaimowitz in Kolno to Wolfe Kaimowitz and Dora Blanc. Kolno was historically a part of Poland, but was part of the Russian Empire at the time. Blanch was the youngest of seven children. Wolfe Kaimowitz emigrated to the United States, and in 1907, Dora Blanc, ten-year-old Blanch, and one other daughter joined him in New York.

Blanch attended schools within Brooklyn, New York, and graduated from Eastern District High School in 1914. Later that year, Kaimowitz died, so Blanch decided to take a job to support her family. Blanch worked clerical positions for fourteen years (1914-1928), saving money for school along the way. She became an American citizen in 1921. After her mother died in 1927, Blanch started taking evening classes at Washington Square College, part of New York University. In 1932, Blanch received her Bachelor of Science degree in Mathematics with a minor in Physics from New York University. She graduated with summa cum laude and was a member of Phi Beta Kappa, a prestigious academic honor society. That same year, she changed her name from Kaimowitz to Blanch, an Americanized version of her mother's name. After writing her thesis titled "Properties of the Veneroni Transformation in S4", she received her Ph.D. from Cornell University in algebraic geometry in 1935.  The results from her thesis were published in the American Journal of Mathematics in 1936.

Career
Blanch was unable to find a job in her area of study after she graduated with her PhD, due to the Great Depression. For a year (1935-1936), she worked in place of a colleague on leave at Hunter College. Afterwards, she worked a clerical position.

Blanch enrolled in an evening course on relativity at Brooklyn College, instructed by Arnold Lowan.  Upon learning of Blanch's PhD in mathematics, Lowan extended an invitation to Blanch to join the Works Progress Administration project, where she was assigned to a supervisory position. In February 1938, she began work on the Mathematical Tables Project of the WPA, for which she was mathematical director and Chair of the Planning Committee. As a member of the Planning Committee, Blanch decided which mathematical functions were to be calculated, and constructed the computing plans used by the computers.  While the Planning Committee was in operation, it included women other than Blanch such as Ida Rhodes, Jenny Rosenthal, and Irene Stegun. The Planning Committee was in charge of 450 human computers with varying knowledge of mathematics.

Blanch's duties entailed designing algorithms that were executed by teams of human computers under her direction. Many of these computers possessed only rudimentary mathematical skills, but the algorithms and error checking in the Mathematical Tables Project were sufficiently well designed that their output defined the standard for transcendental function solutions for decades. This project later became the Computation Laboratory of the National Bureau of Standards. During her last two years at the WPA, she worked as an evening tutor at Brooklyn College.

The Mathematical Tables Project became an independent organization following the termination of the WPA at the end of 1942.  During World War II, it operated as a major computing office for the US government and did calculations for the Office of Scientific Research and Development, the Army's map grid, the Navy's LORAN radio navigation system, the Manhattan Project and other institutions.  The project also performed important calculations for Operation Overlord.  Using a mathematical model developed by Jerzy Neyman, the group helped evaluate strategies designed to bomb the Normandy beaches. Blanch led the group throughout the war.

After the war, Blanch's career was hampered by FBI suspicions that she was secretly a communist. During this time the National Bureau of Standards was investigated by the loyalty board of the Department of Commerce.  Their evidence for her communist ties was scarce and included, for example, the observation that she had never married or had children, as well as the fact that her sister was affiliated with the Communist Party. In a May 1952 hearing, all charges were resolved.  With her name cleared, she was able to resume her work.

Subsequently, she worked for the Institute for Numerical Analysis at UCLA until it was closed in June 1954. She then became a mathematician for the computer division of Consolidated Engineering in Pasadena, California for a couple of months until a friend she had made at the Mathematical Tables Project, Chief mathematician Knox Millsaps, recruited her to be a senior mathematician for the Aerospace Research Laboratory at Wright-Patterson Air Force Base in Dayton, Ohio. The Air Force hired her to work on computations dealing with turbulence, air flow, and transonic and supersonic flight. In 1962, Blanch was promoted to government senior scientist. She was an early member of the ACM.

Publications
Blanch published over 30 articles on functional approximation, numerical analysis and Mathieu functions. Between 1940 and 1942, while at the Mathematical Tables Project, several important papers were jointly published with Lowan, including a project with physicist Hans Bethe which involved complex calculations to determine various properties of stars.
 The Gertrude Blanch Papers (1932–1996)
 Tables of Planck's Radiation and Photon Functions (1940)
 Error in Hayashi's Table of Bessel Functions for Complex Arguments (1941)
 On the Inversion of the Q-Series Associated with Jacobian Elliptic Functions (1942)
 The Internal Temperature Density Distribution of the Sun (1941)

Honors and awards
In 1963, she was elected a Fellow of the American Association for the Advancement of Science.  In 1964, she received the Federal Woman's Award, an award for women who had exemplary professional service in the United States Government.
 Air Force Outstanding Performance Award (1958)
 Air Force Exceptional Service Award (1963)
 Fellow of the American Association for the Advancement of Science (1963)
 Federal Woman's Award (1964)
 Inducted into the Portrait Gallery at the National Institution of Standards and Technology (2017)

Later years
Blanch retired in 1967 at the age of 69, but through Ohio State University continued working as a consultant for the Air Force until 1970 when Ohio State canceled all military funded contracts. Thereafter she moved to San Diego, California where she worked on her book about functional approximations until it was completed in 1982 but never published. Blanch then continued to work on numerical solutions of Mathieu functions, specifically concentrating on the use of continued fractions to achieve highly accurate results in a small number of computational steps to which she completed an unpublished manuscript. She continued this research until her death in January 1996.

The Gertrude Blanch Papers, 1932–1996 are accessible at the Charles Babbage Institute, University of Minnesota, Minneapolis.

References

 Grier, David Alan, "Gertrude Blanch of the Mathematical Tables Project", Annals of the History of Computing, 19.4 (1997), 18–27.
 Grier, David Alan, "The Math Tables Project of the Work Projects Administration: the reluctant start of the computing era", Annals of the History of Computing, 20 (1998), 33–50.
 Grier, David Alan, "When Computers Were Human", 2005.

External links
"Gertrude Blanch", Biographies of Women Mathematicians , Agnes Scott College
Gertrude Blanch Papers, 1932-1996 Charles Babbage Institute, University of Minnesota, Minneapolis.
Computer Oral History Collection: Dr. Gertrude Blanch, 1969-1973  Smithsonian National Museum of American History
Gertrude Blanch, The History of Numerical Analysis and Scientific Computing 
Blanch Biography, University of St Andrews 

1897 births
1996 deaths
Emigrants from the Russian Empire to the United States
New York University alumni
Cornell University alumni
Hunter College faculty
University of California, Los Angeles staff
American women mathematicians
People from Dayton, Ohio
20th-century American mathematicians
20th-century women mathematicians
Eastern District High School alumni
Fellows of the American Association for the Advancement of Science
20th-century American women